Hide and Seek is an upcoming 2023 Indian Kannada-language action thriller film directed by Punith Nagaraju, starring Anup Revanna, Dhanya Ramkumar, Krishna Hebbale and Rajesh Nataranga. The film is written, produced and directed by Punith Nagaraju.

Plot
A police officer is on the trail to hunt an elusive Ghost Leader indulged in trafficking. When a kidnapping order for a wealthy businessman's daughters is given, the protagonist takes the job, but it leads to unexpected twists and turns.

Cast

Anup Revanna
Dhanya Ramkumar
Arvind Rao
Rajesh Nataranga							
Krishna Hebbale								
Bala Rajwadi									
Comedy Khiladigalu Sooraj

Production

The film's first look poster was released by Ashwini Puneeth Rajkumar, wife of Puneeth Rajkumar in Bengaluru. The film is slated for April 2023 release.

References

External links 

Kannada-language films
Indian action thriller films